A cropduster is a plane, or pilot, engaged in agricultural aerial application.

Cropduster may also refer to:

Cropduster (band), an American alternative rock band
Cropduster (album), the band's debut album, 1998
"Cropduster", a song by Pearl Jam from Riot Act 2002